Pomacanchi District is one of seven districts of the Acomayo Province in Peru.

Geography 
Other mountains are listed below:

Ethnic groups 
The people in the district are mainly indigenous citizens of Quechua descent. Quechua is the language which the majority of the population (89.89%) learnt to speak in childhood, 9.94% of the residents started speaking using the Spanish language (2007 Peru Census).

See also 
 Waqra Pukara

References

Districts of the Acomayo Province